"This Ain't a Love Song" is the lead single from American rock band Bon Jovi's sixth studio album, These Days (1995). The rock ballad is an example of the strong rhythm and blues influence that Jon Bon Jovi and Richie Sambora wanted the album to have. It reached number 14 on the US Billboard Hot 100, number two on the Canadian RPM Top Singles chart, number six on the UK Singles Chart, and number one on the Finnish Singles Chart.

Critical reception
James Masterton wrote in his weekly UK chart commentary, "The new single is another ballad although rather more understated and reflective than many they have produced in the past."

Music video
The accompanying music video for "This Ain't a Love Song" was shot at Wat Ratchaburana in Ayuthaya, Thailand, and directed by Andy Morahan.

"Como yo nadie te ha amado"
A Spanish version, "Como yo nadie te ha amado" ("Nobody Has Loved You Like I Do"), was also recorded. However, the lyrics in the two versions differ from each other; the original version talks about a lost love, which is never recovered, while the Spanish version is a reflection on love, about how no one will love someone with the same passion than the narrator.

Mexican singer Yuridia covered the Spanish version, "Como yo nadie te ha amado", on her second studio album Habla El Corazón which peaked at number 16 on the Billboard Hot Latin Songs chart. Yuridia's cover received was nominated at the 2008 Latin Billboard Awards for Latin Pop Airplay of the Year by a Female Artist. Her cover also led to Jon Bon Jovi winning an ASCAP Latin Award in the Pop/Ballad field.

Track listings

US and Canadian CD single; US cassette single
 "This Ain't a Love Song" – 5:06
 "Always" (live at A&M Studios) – 4:45
 "Prostitute" (demo) – 4:28

US and Canadian maxi-CD single
 "This Ain't a Love Song" – 5:06
 "Prostitute" (demo) – 4:28
 "When She Comes" (demo) – 3:29
 "The End" (demo) – 3:39
 "Lonely at the Top" (demo) – 4:14

US 7-inch single and Japanese mini-CD single
 "This Ain't a Love Song" – 5:06
 "Always" (live at A&M Studios) – 4:45

UK CD1
 "This Ain't a Love Song" – 5:04
 "Lonely at the Top" – 4:14
 "The End" – 3:39

UK CD2
 "This Ain't a Love Song" – 5:04
 "When She Comes" – 3:29
 "Wedding Day" – 4:58
 "Prostitute" – 4:28

UK and Australian cassette single; European and Australian CD single
 "This Ain't a Love Song" – 5:04
 "Lonely at the Top" – 4:14

European maxi-CD single
 "This Ain't a Love Song" (album version) – 5:04
 "Prostitute" – 4:28
 "Lonely at the Top" – 4:14
 "When She Comes" – 3:29
 "The End" – 3:39

French CD single
 "This Ain't a Love Song" (album version) – 5:03
 "Always" (album version) – 5:52

Japanese maxi-CD single
 "This Ain't a Love Song"
 "Jon's Comment 1"
 "Always" (live '94)
 "Jon's Comment 2"
 "Someday I'll Be Saturday Night" (live '94)
 "Jon's Comment 3"
 "With a Little Help from My Friends" (live '94)

Charts

Weekly charts

Year-end charts

Certifications

Release history

References

1990s ballads
1995 singles
1995 songs
2006 singles
Bon Jovi songs
Mercury Records singles
Music videos directed by Andy Morahan
Number-one singles in Finland
Rock ballads
Song recordings produced by Jon Bon Jovi
Song recordings produced by Peter Collins (record producer)
Song recordings produced by Richie Sambora
Songs about heartache
Songs written by Desmond Child
Songs written by Jon Bon Jovi
Songs written by Richie Sambora
Yuridia songs